Doriprismatica stellata is a species of sea slug, a dorid nudibranch, a shell-less marine gastropod mollusk in the family Chromodorididae.

Distribution
This species is found in the Western Pacific Ocean from Papua New Guinea, Indonesia and Malaysia.

References

External links
 

Chromodorididae
Gastropods described in 1986